National Tertiary Route 306, or just Route 306 (or ) is a National Road Route of Costa Rica, located in the San José province.

Description
In San José province the route covers Montes de Oca canton (San Pedro, San Rafael districts), Curridabat canton (Granadilla district).

References

Highways in Costa Rica